DWEC may refer to:
 DWEC-AM, an AM radio station broadcasting in Puerto Princesa, branded as Environment Radio
 DWEC-FM, a defunct FM radio station broadcasting in Dagupan, branded as My Only Radio